Nabil Aït Fergane (born 8 April 1992) is an Algerian footballer who currently plays for NA Hussein Dey in the Algerian Ligue Professionnelle 1. Aït Fergane was part of the Algeria national under-17 football team that finished as runner-ups at the 2009 African U-17 Championship.

References

External links
 

1992 births
Algerian footballers
Algerian Ligue Professionnelle 1 players
Algerian Ligue 2 players
Living people
Footballers from Algiers
NA Hussein Dey players
USM Bel Abbès players
RC Relizane players
Algeria youth international footballers
Association football midfielders
21st-century Algerian people